The Super combined competitions of the 2011 IPC Alpine Skiing World Championships were held at Kandahar Banchetta Giovanni N., in Sestriere, Italy on January 19.

Women

Visually Impaired
In the super combined visually impaired, the athlete with a visual impairment has a sighted guide. The two skiers are considered a team, and dual medals are awarded.

Standing

Sitting

Men

Visually Impaired
In the super combined visually impaired, the athlete with a visual impairment has a sighted guide. The two skiers are considered a team, and dual medals are awarded.

Standing

Sitting

References

External links
2011 IPC Alpine Skiing World Championships - Super Combined at ParalympicSportTV's Official YouTube channel

Super combined